Męcinka  is a village in Jawor County, Lower Silesian Voivodeship, in south-western Poland. It is the seat of the administrative district (gmina) called Gmina Męcinka.

References

Villages in Jawor County